Facts of Life may refer to:

 Facts of Life (album), by Bobby Womack, 1973
 Facts of Life (band), American soul/disco band
 "Facts of Life" (Danny Madden song), 1991
 "Facts of Life" (Lime Cordiale song), 2022
 "Facts of Life", a song by King Crimson on the 2003 album The Power to Believe
 "Facts of Life", a song by Lazyboy on the 2004 album Lazyboy TV
 "Facts of Life", a painting by Norman Rockwell

See also
 
 The Facts of Life (disambiguation)